Mert Yazıcıoğlu (born 10 May 1993) is a Turkish actor.

Early life 
Mert Yazıcıoğlu was born on 10 May 1993 in Istanbul. After completing his primary, secondary and high school education in Istanbul, he enrolled in the Management Department of Istanbul Aydın University.

Career 
Upon getting invited to the shooting of a TV series in which his friend was acting, he took the first step towards becoming an actor. First, he joined the Cast 33 agency founded by Sumru Onat and then met actor Ümit Çırak. He soon started to take acting lessons from Ümit Çırak in 3 Mota Eğitim workshops. After studying acting for a while, he made his cinematic debut with the movie Dedemin İnsanları. In 2013, he played the character of "Baran Şamverdi" in the series Karagül, which was broadcast on Fox and starred Ece Uslu, Özcan Deniz, and Ayça Ayşin Turan. Later, he played the character of "Fırat" in the youth series Umuda Kelepçe Vurulmaz, and portrayed the character of "Korkut" in the historical series Mehmed: Bir Cihan Fatihi. He continued his cinematic career by playing the role of "Cenk" in the 2018 movie İyi Oyun. Between 2018–2019, he had a leading role in Kanal D series Bir Litre Gözyaşı, in which he portrayed the character "Mahir Yetkin". Since 2020, he has been starring on Netflix original series Aşk 101. He played in BluTv's surreal crime series "Ölüm Zamanı".

Personal life
Mert Yazıcıoğlu has been dating Turkish actress Afra Saraçoğlu. The couple met while they were shooting a movie called İyi Oyun in 2018.

Filmography

References

External links 
 
 
 

Living people
1993 births
Male actors from Istanbul
Turkish male television actors
21st-century Turkish male actors
Turkish male film actors